Juraj Milý (born 9 December  1996) is a Slovak professional ice hockey winger currently playing for Stuttgart Rebels of the Regionalliga.

Career
Milý was drafted 14th overall in the 2014 CHL Import Draft by the Acadie-Bathurst Titan of the Quebec Major Junior Hockey League. After just one goal in nineteen games however, he departed and spent the remainder of the 2014–15 season with the Muskegon Lumberjacks of the United States Hockey League.

He then returned to Slovakia the following season, playing the 2015–16 season with the HK Orange 20 junior project and HC Košice of the Tipsport Liga, as well as HC Prešov Penguins of the Slovak 1. Liga. He later joined HC 07 Detva in 2017. He signed an extension with Detva on May 1, 2018 before joining MsHK Žilina on October 20, 2018. On May 13, 2019, Milý returned to HC Košice.

References

External links

 

1996 births
Living people
Acadie–Bathurst Titan players
HC 07 Detva players
HC Košice players
Muskegon Lumberjacks players
Slovak ice hockey right wingers
HC Prešov players
Sportspeople from Prešov
MsHK Žilina players
HC 21 Prešov players
Slovak expatriate ice hockey players in Canada
Slovak expatriate ice hockey players in the United States
Slovak expatriate ice hockey players in Germany